The Archdiocese of Strasbourg is a Latin Church ecclesiastical territory or archdiocese of the Catholic Church in France, first mentioned in 343 AD.

It is one of nine archbishoprics in France that have no suffragan dioceses, and it is the only one of those to be exempt to the Holy See in Rome and not within a metropolitan's ecclesiastical province. It has been headed by Archbishop Luc Ravel since February 2017.

History 
The Diocese of Strasbourg was first mentioned in 343, belonging to the ecclesiastical province of the Archbishopric of Mainz since Carolingian times. Archeological diggings below the current Saint Stephen’s Church, Strasbourg (Saint-Étienne) in 1948 and 1956 have unearthed the apse of a church dating back to the late 4th or early 5th century, considered the oldest church in Alsace. It is supposed that this was the first seat of the diocese. The diocese may thus have been founded around 300.
 
The bishop also was the ruler of an ecclesiastical principality (prince-bishopric) in the Holy Roman Empire during the Middle Ages and Early Modern period. For this state, see Prince-Bishopric of Strasbourg.

Since the 15th century, the diocesan seat has been the Cathedral of Notre-Dame de Strasbourg. By the Concordat of 1801, the Diocese of Strasbourg became a public-law corporation of cult (French: établissement public du culte) and the diocesan ambit of Strasbourg was redrawn and all its areas east of the river Rhine were redeployed, forming a part of the Archdiocese of Freiburg since 1821. On 29 November 1801 it gained territory from the Diocese of Basel (Switzerland), Diocese of Metz and Diocese of Speyer (Spiers, Germany). On 25 February 1803 it lost territory to the Diocese of Konstanz, on 26 April 1808 it gained territory from the same and in 1815 lost territory to that Diocese of Konstanz.

In 1871 the bulk of the diocese became part of German Empire, while small fringes remained with France. On 10 July 1874 Strasbourg diocese, with its diocesan ambit reconfined to the borders of then German Alsace, gaining territory from the Diocese of Saint-Dié, and losing territory to the Metropolitan Archdiocese of Besançon, and it became an exempt diocese, immediately subject to the Holy See instead of part of any ecclesiastical province. When the 1905 French law on the Separation of the Churches and the State was enacted, doing away with public-law religious corporations, this did not apply to the Strasbourg diocese which was then within Germany.

After World War I, Alsace along with the diocese was returned to France, but the status from the concordat has been preserved as part of the Local law in Alsace-Moselle.

The diocese was elevated to Archdiocese of Strasbourg on 1 June 1988 by Pope John Paul II but not as metropolitan of an ecclesiastical province and remains exempt. The bishop of this see is appointed by the French president according to the Concordat of 1801. The concordat further provides for the clergy to be paid by the government and Catholic pupils in public schools can receive religious instruction according to archdiocesan guidelines.

It enjoyed papal visits from Pope John Paul II in October 1988 and Pope Francis in November 2014.

Cathedral and Basilicas 
The archiepiscopal cathedral seat is the Cathedral of Notre Dame (Our Lady) in Strasbourg, Grand Est, France, as mother church, a World Heritage Site.

It has four other Minor Basilicas, two in each of the former Alsace region's departments:
 Basilique du Sacré-Cœur (Sacred Heart) in Lutterbach, Haut-Rhin
 Basilique Notre-Dame de Marienthal, Bas-Rhin
 Basilique Notre-Dame de Thierenbach, in Jungholtz, Haut-Rhin
 Basilique Notre-Dame du Mont Sainte-Odile in Ottrott, Bas-Rhin.

Statistics 
As per 2014, it pastorally served 1,380,000 Catholics (74.9% of 1,843,000 total) on 8,280 km² in 767 parishes and 5 missions with 722 priests (517 diocesan, 205 religious), 80 deacons, 1,332 lay religious (282 brothers, 1,050 sisters) and 17 seminarians .
 31 December 2003, the area of the archdiocese comprised a total of 1,713,416 inhabitants of which 75.9% (1,300,000) are Catholics, divided in 762 parishes covering an area of 8,280 km². Also, 619 diocese priests, 50 deacons, 288 ordained priests and 1,728 nuns belonged to the archdiocese.

Episcopal ordinaries
(Incomplete, first centuries unavailable)

Suffragan bishops of Strasbourg 
 Amawich (Alavico) (999 – 1001.02.03)
 Werner de Bavière (Werner d’Asburgo) (1002 – 1028.10.28)
 Guillaume (Guglielmo, William) (1029 – 1047.11.07)
 Hermann (Wizelin) (1048 – 1065.01.15)
 Werner (Werner von Achalm) (1065–1079)
 Thiepald (Teobaldo) (1079–1084)
 Otton de Hohenstaufen (Otto von Büren) (1085 – 1100.08.03)
 Balduin (Baldovino, Baldwin) (1100–1100)
 Cunon (Conrad) (1100–1123)
 Bruno(n) (1123–1126)
 Eberhard (1126–1127)
 Bruno de Hohenberg (1129 – 1131.03.22)
 Gebhard (1131–1141)
 Burchard (1141 – 1162.07.10)
 Rodolphe (Rudof) (1162–1179)
 Father Conrad de Geroldseck (1179 – 1180.12.21)
 Henri de Hasebourg (1181 – 1190.03.25)
 Conrad de Hunebourg (1190 – 1202.11.03)
 Henri de Veringen (1202 – 1223.03.11)
 Berthold de Teck (1223–1244)
 Henri de Stahleck (1245 – 1260.03.04)
 Gautier de Geroldseck (1260 – 1263.02.12)
 Henri de Geroldseck (1263–1273)
 Father Conrad de Lichtenberg (1273 – 1299.08.01)
 Frédéric de Lichtenberg (1299 – 1306.12.20)
 Jean de Dirpheim (1306.02.18 – death 1328.11.06); previously Bishop of Eichstätt (Germany) (1305.09.23 – 1306.02.18)
 Berthold de Bucheck, Teutonic Order (O.T.) (1328.11.28 – 1353.11.25); previously Bishop of Speyer (Germany) (1328.05.07 – 1328.11.28)
 Jean de Lichtenberg (1353 – 1365.09.14)
 Jean de Luxembourg-Ligny (1366 – 1371.04.04)
 Lamprecht von Brunn (1371.04.28 – 1374.04.20), previously Bishop of Brixen (South Tirol, now Italy) (1364.01.27 – 1364.02.14 not possessed), Bishop of Speyer (Germany) (1364.02.14 – 1371.04.28); later Bishop of Bamberg (Germany) (1374.04.28 – 1398)
 Frederik van Blankenheim (Frédéric de Blankenheim) (1375.07.05 – 1393.07.07); next Bishop of Basel (Switzerland) (1391.10.13 – 1393.07.07), Bishop of Utrecht (Netherlands) (1393.07.07 – death 1423.10.10)
Father Ludovico di Thierstein (1393 not possessed)
 Father Burcardo di Lützelstein (1393–1394)
 Guillaume de Diest (1394 – death 1439.10.06)
 Auxiliary Bishop: Egidio von Byderborch, Carmelite Order (O. Carm.) (1428.11.29 – ?), Titular Bishop of Rhosus (1428.11.29 – ?)
 Corrado di Busnang (1439 – 1440.11.11)
 Robert de Bavière (= of Bavaria) (1440 – 1478.10.18)
 Auxiliary Bishop: Hermann (1447 – death 1455), no other prelature
 Albert de Bavière (Calberto del Palatinato-Mosbach) (1478 – 1506.08.20)
 Guillaume de Hohnstein (1506 – 1541.06.29)
 Érasme de Limbourg (1541 – 1568.11.27)
 Jean de Manderscheid (1568 – death 1592.04.22) 
Apostolic Administrator Mr. Jean Georges de Brandebourg (1592 – retired 1604) no other office
 Cardinal Charles de Lorraine-Vaudémont (1604 – 1607.11.24), previously Bishop of Metz (France) (1578.07.18 – 1607.11.24), created Cardinal-Deacon of S. Agata alla Suburra (1591.04.05 – death 1607.11.24)
 Auxiliary Bishop: Adam Petz (1605.07.18 – death 1626.11.26), Titular Bishop of Tripolis (1605.07.18 – 1626.11.26)
 Leopold V, Archduke of Austria (Leopold Erzherzog von Österreich-Tyrol, Mr. Léopold d’Autriche-Tyrol) (24 November 1607 - retired 19 April 1626), died 1632
 Leopold Wilhelm Erzherzog von Österreich (born Germany) (10 October 1626 - death 2 November 1662); previously Bishop of Passau (Bavaria, Germany) ([1625.11.08] 1626.02.01 – 1662.11.02); also Bishop of Halberstadt (Germany) (1627.12.24 – 1648), Bishop of Olomouc (Olmütz in Moravia, Czech Republic) ([1637.11.16] 1638.09.28 – 1662.11.02), Bishop of Wrocław (Breslau, Poland) (1656.01.21 – 1662.11.02)
 Auxiliary Bishop: Paulus Aldringen (born Luxemburg) (1627.04.28 – death 1644.03.28), Titular Bishop of Tripolis (1627.04.28 – 1644.03.28)
 Franz Egon Fürst von Fürstenberg (born Germany) (19 January 1663 - death 1 April 1682), previously Bishop of Metz (France) (1658 – 1663.01.19)
 Wilhelm Egon von Fürstenberg (8 June 1682 - death 10 April 1704), also Coadjutor Archbishop of Köln (Cologne, Germany) (1687 – 1688), created Cardinal-Priest of S. Onofrio (1689.11.14 – 1704.04.10); previously Bishop of Metz (France) (1663.09.28 – 1668)
 Auxiliary Bishop: Johann Peter von Quentell (born Germany) (1698.05.16 – 1699.08.14), Titular Bishop of Adrianopolis (1698.05.16 – death 1710.04.13); next Auxiliary Bishop of Diocese of Münster (Germany) (1699.08.14 – 1710.04.13)
 Armand-Gaston-Maximilien de Rohan de Soubise (10 April 1704 - death 19 July 1749), succeeding as previous Coadjutor Bishop of Strasbourg (1701.04.18 – 1704.04.09) and Titular Bishop of Tiberias (1701.04.18 – 1704.04.09); created Cardinal-Priest of SS. Trinità al Monte Pincio (1721.06.16 – 1749.07.16)
 Auxiliary Bishop: Guillaume Tual (1715.02.04 – death 1716.02.24), Titular Bishop of Nyssa (1715.02.04 – 1716.02.24)
 Auxiliary Bishop: Louis Philippe d’Auneau de Visé (1719.01.08 – death 1729.06.26), Titular Bishop of Phessa (1718.03.14 – 1729.06.26)
 Auxiliary Bishop: Jean Vivant (1730.11.28 – death 1739.02.16), Titular Bishop of Parium (1730.11.28 – 1739.02.16)
 Auxiliary Bishop: Johann Franz Riccius (1739.10.11 – death 1756.05.12), Titular Bishop of Verinopolis (1739.10.11 – 1756.05.12)
 François-Armand-Auguste de Rohan-Soubise-Ventadour (19 July 1749 - death 28 June 1756), succeeding as previous Coadjutor Bishop of Strasbourg (France) (1742.05.21 – 1749.07.19) and (Latin) Titular Bishop of Ptolemais (in Phoenicia: Acre) (1742.07.30 – 1747.04.10), already Cardinal-Priest but with no Title assigned (1747.04.10 – 1756.06.28)
 Louis César Constantin, prince de Rohan-Guéméné (23 September 1756 - death 11 March 1779), created Cardinal-Priest with no Title assigned (1761.11.23 – 1779.03.11)
 Auxiliary Bishop: Toussaint Duvernin (1757.05.23 – death 1785.08.08), Titular Bishop of Arathia (1757.05.23 – 1785.08.08)
 Louis René Édouard de Rohan-Guéméné (11 March 1779 - resigned 29 November 1801), succeeding as previous Coadjutor Bishop of Strasbourg ([1759.11.22] 1760.03.24 – 1779.03.11) and Titular Bishop of Canopus (1760.03.24 – 1778.06.01); already Cardinal-Priest with no Title assigned (1778.06.01 – death 1803.02.16)
 Auxiliary Bishop: Jean Jacques Lantz (1786.04.03 – death 1799.01.06), Titular Bishop of Dora (1786.04.03 – 1799.01.06)
 Jean-Pierre Saurine (9 April 1802 - death 7 May 1813)
 Gustave-Maximilien-Juste de Croÿ-Solre (8 August 1817 - 4 July 1823), next Metropolitan Archbishop of Rouen ([1823.07.04] 1823.11.17 – death 1844.01.01), created Cardinal-Priest of S. Sabina (1829.05.21 – 1844.01.01)
 Claude-Marie-Paul Tharin (23 August 1823 - 16 November 1826 Resigned), died 1843
 Jean-François-Marie Le Pappe de Trévern (13 December 1826 - death 27 August 1842), previously Bishop of Aire (France) ([1823.01.13] 1823.05.16 – 1827.04.09)
 Coadjutor Bishop: Bishop-elect Denis-Auguste Affre (1840.04.27 – 1840.05.26), Titular Bishop of Pompeiopolis (1840.04.27 – 1840.05.26); later Metropolitan Archbishop of Paris (France) ([1840.05.26] 1840.07.13 – 1848.06.27)
 Andreas (André) Räß (Raess) (27 August 1842 - death 17 November 1887), succeeding as previous Coadjutor Bishop of Strasbourg ([1840.08.05] 1840.12.14 – 1842.08.27) and Titular Bishop of Rhodiopolis (1840.12.14 – 1842.08.27)
 Apostolic Administrator Pierre-Paul Stumpf (1883.02.25 – 1887.11.17 see below), while Coadjutor Bishop of Strasbourg ([1881.04.09] 1881.05.13 – 1887.11.17) and Titular Bishop of Cæsaropolis (1881.05.13 – 1887.11.17)
 Pierre-Paul Stumpf (see above 17 November 1887 - death 10 August 1890)
 Adolf Fritzen (Fitzen) (24 January 1891 - retired 31 July 1919), emeritate as Titular Archbishop of Mocissus (31 July 1919 – death 1919.09.07)
 Auxiliary Bishop: Charles Marbach (1891.06.04 – death 1901.09), Titular Bishop of Paphos (1891.06.04 – 1916.10.15)
 Auxiliary Bishop: Franz Zorn von Bulach (1901.10.24 – retired 1919), Titular Bishop of Erythræ (1901.10.24 – death 1925.01.13)
 Charles-Joseph-Eugène Ruch (23 April 1919 - death 29 August 1945); previously Coadjutor Bishop of Nancy (Alsace, France) (1913.06.14 – 1918.10.20) and Titular Bishop of Gerasa (1913.06.14 – 1918.10.20), succeeding as Bishop of Nancy (1918.10.20 – 1919.04.23)
 Jean-Julien Weber, P.S.S. (29 August 1945 - retired 30 December 1966), succeeding as former Coadjutor Bishop of Strasbourg ([1945.05.19] 1945.06.01 – 1945.08.29) and Titular Bishop of Messene (1945.06.01 – 1945.08.29); emeritate first as Archbishop ad personam (1962.03.25 – resigned 1966.12.30), died 1981
 Léon-Arthur-Auguste Elchinger (30 December 1966 - retired 16 July 1984), succeeded as former Coadjutor Bishop of Strasbourg ([1957.05.17] 1957.10.26 – 1966.12.30) and Titular Bishop of Antandrus (1957.10.26 – 1966.12.30); died 1998
 Coadjutor Bishop: Roger Joseph Heckel, Jesuit Order (S.J.) (1980.03.27 – death 1982.09.26), previously Roman Curia official : Vice-Secretary of Pontifical Commission of Justice and Peace (1975 – 1976), Undersecretary of Pontifical Commission of Justice and Peace (1976 – 1977), Secretary of Pontifical Commission of Justice and Peace (1977 – 1980.03.27)
 Charles Amarin Brand (16 July 1984 - see promoted 1 June 1988 see below), previously Titular Bishop of Uthina (1971.12.28 – 1981.07.30) as Auxiliary Bishop of Fréjus–Toulon (France) (1971.12.28 – 1976.11.18) and then as Auxiliary Bishop of Strasbourg (1976.11.18 – 1981.07.30), next exempt Archbishop of Monaco (Monaco) (1981.07.30 – 1984.07.16)
 Auxiliary Bishop: Léon Hégelé (1985.09.09 – retired 2000.12.18), Titular Bishop of Utica (1985.09.09 – death 2014.02.11)

Archbishops of Strasbourg
 Archbishop-bishop Charles Amarin Brand (see above 1 June 1988 see promoted - retired 23 October 1997), also Vice-President of Council of European Bishops’ Conferences (1986 – 1990), President of Council of European Bishops’ Conferences (1990 – 1993); died 2013
 Joseph Pierre Aimé Marie Doré, Sulpicians (P.S.S.) (23 October 1997 - 25 August 2006 Resigned), stayed on as Apostolic Administrator of Strasbourg (2006.08.25 – retired 2007.04.21)
 Jean-Pierre Grallet, O.F.M. (21 April 2007 - retired 2017.02.18); succeeded as previous Titular Bishop of Dardanus (2004.09.27 – 2007.04.21) and Auxiliary Bishop of Strasbourg (2004.09.27 – 2007.04.21)
 Auxiliary Bishop: Vincent Jordy (2008.09.19 – 2011.07.22), Titular Bishop of Idassa (2008.09.19 – 2011.07.22); next Bishop of Saint-Claude (France) (2011.07.22 – ...)
 Luc Ravel, C.R.S.V. (2017.02.18 – ...), previously Military Ordinary of France (2009.10.07 – 2017.02.18).

Gallery

See also 
 List of Catholic dioceses in France
 Aurelia of Strasbourg
 Catholic Church in France

References

Sources and external links 

 Official website of the diocese
 GCatholic with Google map and - satelliet photo
 Official website of the cathedral
 Catholic-Hierarchy.org
 Image of the cathedral
 

Archdiocese
Roman Catholic dioceses in France
Catholic Church in Alsace
Roman Catholic dioceses in the Holy Roman Empire